Gerry Kassia Dialungana (1951 - 2 February 2002), was a Congo music recording artist and solo guitarist, in the Democratic Republic of the Congo (DRC). He was once a member of the soukous band TPOK Jazz, led by François Luambo Makiadi, which dominated the Congolese music scene from the 1950s through the 1980s.

History
He was born in Leopoldville, now Kinshasa, DRC, in 1951. During his youth, he was an admirer of Rochereau's singing voice. Gerry Dialungana taught himself guitar by mimicking Docteur Nico. "I didn't choose to be a musician," he says, "it just happened."  After playing locally with several amateur groups, he made his professional debut with Les Malous, in 1970. In 1973 he joined Les Grand Maquisards, where Dalienst was a member.  In 1976, he joined TPOK Jazz, where he became a member of the band's directional committee. The committee was composed of band members and was responsible for general operations, social functions,  equipment, rehearsal schedules, and discipline.

Discography
Gerry Dialungana is credited with the composition of the following recorded titles:

 Tembe Luntandila - with TPOK Jazz 
 Kufwa Ntangu - with TPOK Jazz
 Mukungu - With TPOK Jazz
 Kuna Okeyi Obongisa 
 Hommage a Franco - by Gerry Dialungana & Mantuika

See also
 Franco Luambo Makiadi
 Sam Mangwana
 Josky Kiambukuta
 Simaro Lutumba
 Ndombe Opetum
 Youlou Mabiala
 Mose Fan Fan
 Wuta Mayi
 TPOK Jazz
 List of African musicians

References

External links
 Overview of Composition of TPOK Jazz
 The Biography of Gerry Dialungana (French)

Democratic Republic of the Congo musicians
TPOK Jazz members
People from Kinshasa
1951 births
2002 deaths
Democratic Republic of the Congo guitarists